Dastjerd (also Romanized as Dastgird)  is a city and capital of; Khalajastan District, in Qom Province, Iran. At the 2006 census, its population was 1,121, in 351 families.

References 

Cities in Markazi Province